John Eckhardt Jr, (August 27, 1911 – January 5, 1991), professionally billed as Johnny Eck, was an American freak show performer in sideshows and a film actor. Born with  sacral agenesis, Eck is best known today for his role in Tod Browning's 1932 cult classic film Freaks and his appearances as a bird creature in several Tarzan films. He was often billed as "The Amazing Half-Boy", "King of the Freaks" and  "The Most Remarkable Man Alive".

Besides being a sideshow performer and actor, the multi-talented Eck was also an artist, musician, photographer, illusionist, penny arcade owner, Punch and Judy operator, and expert model-maker.

Early life
John Eckhardt Jr. was born on August 27, 1911, to Emilia (born 1876) and John Eckhardt, Sr. (born 1874) in Baltimore, Maryland, as a fraternal twin. His brother Robert Eckhardt was also a performer and he had an older sister named Caroline Laura Eckhardt. Eck was born with a truncated torso due to sacral agenesis. Though Eck would sometimes describe himself as "snapped off at the waist", he had unusable, underdeveloped legs and feet that he would hide under custom-made clothing. At birth, Eck weighed two pounds (0.9 kg) and was less than eight inches (20 cm) in length. He would eventually reach a height of eighteen inches (45 cm). Although Eck capitalized on the resemblance between himself and Robert, the twins were fraternal. Aside from the sacral agenesis, Eck was healthy.

Eck was walking on his hands before his brother was standing when he was a year old. Both of the Eckhardt twins could read by the age of four. The twins had an older sister named Caroline who educated Eck at home until he and his brother enrolled in public school at age seven. He recalled that larger students would "fight each other for the 'honor' or 'privilege' of lifting [him] up the stone steps" to school, and that school windows were blacked out to discourage throngs of curious onlookers from peering in at Eck during his studies. In spite of the scrutiny, Eck remained consistently upbeat about his birth defect. When asked if he wished he had legs, he quipped, "Why would I want those? Then I'd have pants to press." He challenged those who did have legs by asking, "What can you do that I can't do, except tread water?"

Emilia Eckhardt intended that Eck go into the ministry, and the young Eck was often called upon to perform impromptu sermons for guests. "I would climb atop of a small box and preach against drinking beer and damning sin and the devil," Eck recalled in an autobiographical fragment. These sermons quickly came to an end when Eck began passing around a saucer for donations. At an early age, Eck developed an interest in painting and woodworking, and would spend hours with his brother carving and painting elaborate, fully articulated circuses.

Professional career

In late 1923, Eck and his brother attended a performance of stage magic at a local church by John McAslan. When McAslan asked for volunteers for his act, 12-year-old Eck bounded onto the stage on his hands to the surprise of the magician. McAslan convinced Eck to join the sideshow with him as manager; Eck agreed, but only if his brother was also employed. Robert was charged with looking after his brother by their mother. His parents signed a one-year contract, which Eck claimed the magician later changed to a ten-year contract by adding a zero. In 1924, Eck left McAslan and signed on with a carny named Captain John Sheesley.

Eck was billed as a single-o (solo sideshow act), though he traveled with Robert and used Robert's normality to emphasize his own abnormal physique. His performance included sleight-of-hand and acrobatic feats including his famous one-armed handstand. Eck often performed in a tuxedo jacket while perched upon a tasseled stool. Eck performed for Ringling Brothers, Barnum and Bailey and others.

Eck went to the Canadian Exposition in the summer of 1931. Eck was performing in Montreal when he was approached by a MGM Studios talent scout to be cast for his first feature film as the "Half-Boy" in Tod Browning's 1932 film Freaks.

Eck got along quite well with Tod Browning and was often at his side while on set. Eck would later say that "Browning wanted me to stay as close to him as possible. He told me whenever I have an empty seat or chair, you are to sit alongside me while we shoot." Although he sometimes tried to socialize, he didn't feel comfortable mingling with his castmates, whom he described as a "happy, noisy crowd" and "childish, silly and in a world all their own." At one point he complained that they had gone "Hollywood" because of the film, "wear[ing] sunglasses and acting funny." When Pete Robinson had difficulty lying on a blanket in one scene, Eck made the comment that if he had legs, he would have lain on a fakir's bed of nails. Olga Baclanova would reminisce fondly of her costar (whom she described as "handsome"), "When we finished the picture, he came and gave me a present. He had made a circus ring made from matches. He said he had made it in my honor."

Eck claimed that Browning wished to do a follow-up picture with him and Robert where he would play a mad scientist's creation. However, Browning's career was irretrievably hurt by Freaks, and he no longer had the clout with studios to do many of the projects he wished to do. Eck was also disappointed by how much of his part had been trimmed from the film in the nearly thirty minutes that were cut by censors.

After Freaks, Eck was featured as a bird creature or "Gooney Bird" in three Tarzan movies: Tarzan the Ape Man (1932), Tarzan Escapes (1936) and Tarzan's Secret Treasure (1941). In order to create the bird costume used by Eck for the Tarzan films, footage which was filmed during the production of Freaks in 1931, a full body cast was taken of him. When the Eckhardt home was facing foreclosure due to the oncoming Great Depression, Eck performed for the Ripley's Believe It or Not! Odditorium at the 1933 Chicago World's Fair. It was there that Eck was billed as "the Most Remarkable Man Alive".

Famous illusion
In 1937, Eck and Robert were recruited by the illusionist and hypnotist Rajah Raboid, for his "Miracles of 1937" show. In it they performed a magic feat that amazed audiences.  Raboid performed the traditional sawing-a-man-in-half illusion, except with an unexpected twist.  At first Robert would pretend to be a member of the audience and heckle the illusionist during his routine, resulting in Robert being called on stage to be sawed in half himself.  During the illusion, Robert would then be switched with his twin brother Eck, who played the top half of his body, and a dwarf who played the bottom half, concealed in specially-built pant legs. After seeming to have been sawn off, the legs would suddenly get up and start running away, prompting Eck to jump off the table and start chasing them around the stage, screaming, "Come back!" "I want my legs back!" Sometimes he even chased the legs into the audience. The subsequent reaction was amazing – people would scream and sometimes even flee the theater in terror.  As Eck described it, "The men were more frightened than the women – the women couldn't move because the men were walking across their laps, headed for the exit." The act provided the perfect jolt by frightening people at first but then caused just as much laughter and applause. The illusion would end with stage hands plucking up Eck and setting him atop "his" legs and then twirling him off-stage to be replaced by his twin Robert, who would then loudly threaten to sue Raboid and storm out of the theater. Their act was so popular that they played to packed audiences up and down the East Coast.

In addition to film, sideshow and stage, Eck was also pursuing other interests in this period. He and his brother were musicians, having their own twelve-piece orchestra in Baltimore. Eck conducted while Robert played the piano. Eck continued his love of drawing and painting, early on choosing such subjects as pretty girls, ships and himself. He was also a race car enthusiast and the driver of his own custom-built race car that was street-legal in Baltimore, the "Johnny Eck Special". In 1938, Eck climbed the Washington Monument on his hands.

Later life
When sideshows lost popular appeal, the Eckhardt brothers returned to their red brick rowhouse at 622 North Milton Avenue, in the East-side, working-class section of Baltimore. This was the same house that the family had lived in since 1906, and is where the Eckhardt brothers resided for the rest of their lives. In Baltimore they bought and ran a penny arcade until a business tax forced them out of business. In the 1950s, the brothers bought and ran a used children's train ride in a local park; Eck acting as conductor. Eck also became a screen painter, having learned the craft from William Oktavec, a grocer and local folk artist who invented the art form in 1913. Eck is interviewed about the craft in the 1989 documentary film The Screen Painters. Eck would sit on the steps of his porch with his Chihuahua, Major, telling stories about his life. He and his brother often performed Punch and Judy shows for the children who would come to visit. However, the Eckhardts' neighborhood was increasingly becoming less safe because of drugs and crime.

The 1980s brought more visitors as the video release of Freaks attracted a new generation of fans, some of whom Eck wasn't entirely comfortable with, telling a friend, "You'd be surprised to see these 'avid' fans. I say they are crazy." But he also expressed dismay at his own circumstances.  Despite having a notable career that had spanned back to the 1920s, Eck had very little to show materially for his successes – which he attributed to being taken advantage of over the years by unscrupulous managers, "sharp crooks", and even "best friends." Describing the situation of fans dropping by his rowhouse on Milton, Eck wrote to a close friend in 1985, "I am so embarrassed – I would love to be financially able to entertain these wonderful people in a refined way – a tiny sandwich, cold Cola or something..."

In January 1987, the then 76-year-old Eckhardt brothers were robbed in an ordeal that lasted several hours. One of the two thieves mocked and sat on Eck while the other took his belongings. Thereafter, Eck went into seclusion and the brothers no longer invited visitors into their home. Eck would go on to say, "If I want to see freaks, all I have to do is look out the window."

Death
On January 5, 1991, Eck had a heart attack in his sleep, dying at age 79 at the home where he was born. Robert died on February 25, 1995, aged 83. They are buried under one headstone in Green Mount Cemetery, Baltimore.

Biographical film
A Hollywood feature film on the life of Johnny Eck has been pursued since the 1990s by Leonardo DiCaprio. A screenplay has been written by Caroline Thompson, the scriptwriter of Edward Scissorhands. Production will be by Pelagius Films and Joseph Fries will produce while Leonardo DiCaprio and Joseph Rappa executive produce the film. Production notes include James Franco as a possible replacement to play the Eckhardt twins.

In popular culture

 The song "Table Top Joe", which describes a man without a lower body who becomes a famous entertainer, by Tom Waits is based loosely on the life of Johnny Eck.
 He is also mentioned in the piece "Lucky Day (Overture)" on Waits' album The Black Rider.
 A character inspired by Eck makes a brief appearance in a Victorian sideshow in the Doctor Who novel Camera Obscura by Lloyd Rose.

Notes

Bibliography
 American Sideshow: An Encyclopedia of History's Most Wondrous and Curiously Strange Performers (Tarcher/Penguin, 2005) by Marc Hartzman. Johnny Eck and his twin brother are featured on the cover.
 
 Skal, David J. The Monster Show, pages 145–6. Second edition, 2002. Faber And Faber, New York. 
 Raymond, Warren A. (2014) The Johnny Eck Photo Album First Edition, Wolf's Head Press, Silver Spring, MD. ASIN B00MJ8QTUG.

External links

 Johnny Eck Museum, online collection of photographs and ephemera
 
 

1911 births
1991 deaths
American twins
American male child actors
American people with disabilities
People from Baltimore
Sideshow performers
Burials at Green Mount Cemetery
People with caudal regression syndrome